Auma-Weidatal was a Verwaltungsgemeinschaft ("collective municipality") in the district of Greiz, in Thuringia, Germany. The seat of the Verwaltungsgemeinschaft was in Auma. The Verwaltungsgemeinschaft was disbanded on 1 December 2011, when its constituent municipalities were merged into the towns Auma-Weidatal (formed at the same date) and Zeulenroda-Triebes.

The Verwaltungsgemeinschaft Auma-Weidatal consisted of the following municipalities:

Auma
Braunsdorf 
Göhren-Döhlen 
Merkendorf 
Silberfeld 
Staitz 
Wiebelsdorf 
Zadelsdorf

Former Verwaltungsgemeinschaften in Thuringia